Low-density lipoprotein receptor-related protein 10 is a protein that in humans is encoded by the LRP10 gene.

References

Further reading